Airscape: The Fall of Gravity is 2D platform game developed by Australian studio Cross-Product and published by EQ Games in 2015 for Microsoft Windows. The player is in the role of an octopus navigating through a world of aliens, trying to save fellow sea critters from an unknown evil character.

Gameplay
Most of the levels are divided into zones, with each zone being unlocked when critters from the previous zones levels are saved.

Reception
Airscape: The Fall of Gravity received generally favourable reviews collated on Metacritic for PC, receiving a total score of 75/100.

References

External links 

2015 video games
Platform games
Video games developed in Australia
Windows games
Windows-only games